Arthrosaura tyleri is a species of lizard in the family Gymnophthalmidae. The species is endemic to Venezuela.

Etymology
The specific name, tyleri, is in honor of Sidney F. Tyler, Jr. (1850–1937), who as an American lawyer, banker, historian, and photographer.

Geographic range
A. tyleri is only found on the summit of Cerro Duida in Amazonas state, Venezuela.

Reproduction
A. tyleri is oviparous.

References

Further reading
Burt CE, Burt MD (1931). "South American Lizards in the Collection of the American Museum of Natural History". Bulletin of the American Museum of Natural History 61 (7): 227–395. (Pantodactylus tyleri, new species, pp. 362–364, Figures 14 & 15).
Hoogmoed MS, Ávila-Pires TCS (1992). "Studies on the species of the South American lizard genus Arthrosaura Boulenger (Reptilia: Sauria: Teiidae), with the resurrection of two species [A. versteegii, Pantodactylus tyleri ]". Zoologische Mededelingen 66: 453–484. (Arthrosaura tyleri, new combination, p. 477).
Rivas GA, Molina CR, Ugueto GN, Barros TR, Barrio-Amorós CL, Kok PJR (2012). "Reptiles of Venezuela: an updated and commented checklist". Zootaxa 3211: 1–64.

Arthrosaura
Reptiles described in 1931
Reptiles of Venezuela
Endemic fauna of Venezuela
Taxa named by Charles Earle Burt
Taxa named by May Danheim Burt